Regina is a neighborhood within the Nokomis community in Minneapolis, Minnesota. Its boundaries are 42nd Street to the north, Chicago Avenue to the east, 46th Street to the south, and Interstate 35W to the west. It shares a neighborhood organization with the Field and Northrop neighborhoods.

References

External links

Minneapolis Neighborhood Profile - Regina
Field Regina Northrop Neighborhood Group

Neighborhoods in Minneapolis